The 2000 ARFU Asian Rugby Championship was the 17th edition  of the tournament, and was played in Aomori. The 8 teams were divided in two division. Japan won the tournament.

Tournament

First Division

Second Division

References

2000
2000 rugby union tournaments for national teams
1999–2000 in Japanese rugby union
International rugby union competitions hosted by Japan
2000 in Asian rugby union